Colt Studio Group is an American pornography company. Colt has produced gay pornography since 1967. Colt started in New York City, moved to Los Angeles for 25, and is now based in San Francisco, California.

In 2007, Colt Studio Group celebrated its fortieth anniversary. San Francisco mayor Gavin Newsom signed a proclamation declaring February 23, 2007 as "Colt Studio Day" in celebration of this anniversary. This proclamation attracted criticism from conservative commentators including then–Fox News commentator Bill O'Reilly.

Colt was discussed in a 2014 article in the academic journal Fashion Theory by Shaun Cole, who argued that the characters in the company's pornography are "constructed through their clothing and costuming", and noted that it was famed for its "presentation of hypermasculine
images". He also observed that the choice of the name "Colt" by the company's founders, Jim French and Lou Thomas, reflected a "gun theme"; a previous company founded by French had been called "Lüger", after the German pistol. According to Cole, French's use of the pseudonym "Rip Colt" was "inspired by an amateur photographer in San Francisco" named Rip Searby.

References

External links
 Official website
 

American gay pornographic film studios
Pornography in San Francisco
Entertainment companies based in California
Companies based in San Francisco
American companies established in 1967
Entertainment companies established in 1967
1967 establishments in New York City